, sometimes translated erroneously as Jun Koga, (born Kanagawa Prefecture, 25 February 1975) is a Japanese former rugby union player who played as Centre.

Career
After his graduation from Yamanashi Gakuin University, for whose rugby club he played, Koga joined Sanyo Wild Knights, where he played throughout all of his career until his retirement in 2008. He was also part of the 1999 Rugby World Cup squad, but he never had a cap for Japan.

Notes

External links
Jun Koga international stats
Atsushi Koga Top League profile

1975 births
Living people
Japanese rugby union players
Saitama Wild Knights players
Sportspeople from Kanagawa Prefecture
Japan international rugby union players
Rugby union centres